Torellia cornea is a species of small sea snail, a marine gastropod mollusk in the family Capulidae, the cap snails.

Distribution

Description 
The maximum recorded shell length is 19.4 mm.

Habitat 
Minimum recorded depth is 500 m. Maximum recorded depth is 2818 m.

References

External links

Capulidae
Gastropods described in 1951